Tephraciura phantasma is a species of tephritid or fruit flies in the genus Tephraciura of the family Tephritidae.

Distribution
Namibia.

References

Tephritinae
Insects described in 1935
Diptera of Africa